Penis clamp is an external penis compression device that treats male urinary incontinence. Incontinence clamps for men are applied to compress the urethra to compensate for the malfunctioning of the natural urinary sphincter, preventing leakage from the bladder with minimal restriction of blood flow.

Description 
A penis clamp comprises a pair of elastic jaw members having a distal end and form a clamshell-type of restraint, being able to be opened and closed by the patient to release and contain urine at the will of the patient. The inner surface wraps around the penis with a cushioned easily disinfected clamp that is hinged at one end and provides adjustable tension to prevent unwanted urinary flow from the bladder. The outer surface is made to be openable via a one-handed pressure release. There were models of urethra clamping devices that date back from the 1920s. They are most commonly made from stainless steel and plastic on the outer surface and silicone or rubber on the inner surface. They are usually applied as a cost-effective solution to urinary incontinence.

Use 
Men with urinary incontinence patients are generally left with a choice between multiple forms of management of this illness: surgery, collecting systems, absorbent products, intermittent catheters, indwelling catheters, or penile compression devices.Artificial urinary sphincters are the current gold standard for the management of post-prostatectomy incontinence with acceptable long-term success rates. However, penis clamps are a reasonable alternative when surgical fitness or cost is an issue.

Risks 
Penile compression devices such as penis clamps have shown to cause a significant reduction in incontinence, however long-term use of these devices has the risk of complications, such as pain, urethral erosion, obstruction, and edema. There is evidence that prolonged use of penis clamps compromise tissue and blood flow and promote the development of inflammatory response because of the elevation of pro-inflammatory cytokines. However, none of the PCDs cause sustained irritation or impaired blood flow, and generally, patients yield good recovery around 40 minutes after the removal of the devices. It is recommended to de-clamp these devices at a regular interval of four hours.

See also 
 Urinary incontinence management
 Artificial urinary sphincter (AUS)
 Urinary catheterization
 Intermittent catheterisation

References 

Urology
Urological conditions
Medical devices
Urologic procedures